The FIS Team Tour 2012 was a team competition that took place at Willingen and Oberstdorf located in Germany, between 11–19 February 2012.

Results

Overall

References

External links 
 Official website 

FIS Team Tour
2012 in ski jumping
2012 in German sport
February 2012 sports events in Europe